Cylindera froggatti is a species of ground beetle of the subfamily Cicindelinae that can be found in Australia and Indonesia. The species are black coloured with yellow eyes.

References

froggatti
Beetles described in 1887
Beetles of Asia